The Ream Wilson Clearwater Trail, also known as Clearwater East West Trail, is a 13-mile bicycling and pedestrian trail corridor under development in Clearwater, Florida. It connects areas near the Gulf of Mexico at Clearwater Beach to areas near Tampa Bay at Safety Harbor. Parking is available where the trail runs by the Long Center, Coachman Ridge Park, Northeast Coachman Park, Cliff Stephens Park, the Eddie C. Moore Recreation Complex, Del Oro Park, and Cooper's Bayou Park.  The trail also connects to north–south trails including the Pinellas Trail and (proposed) Florida Progress Trail (along Progress Energy's  right of way by US 19).

Connecting many parks the trail offers opportunities to access nature walks, photography, picnics, and fishing.

References

External links
Eastern section map Clearwater Parks and Recreation
Western section map Clearwater Parks and Recreation
Distance chart

Clearwater, Florida
Hiking trails in Florida